Yakub Dzhambekovich Shamilov (born 25 April 1991 in Argun, Chechnya) is a Russian judoka of Chechen nationality.

He is the 2016 Abu Dhabi champion

References

External links
 

Russian male judoka
Living people
1994 births
Russian people of Chechen descent
Sportspeople from Chechnya
Universiade medalists in judo
Universiade bronze medalists for Russia
Medalists at the 2013 Summer Universiade
Judoka at the 2019 European Games
European Games competitors for Russia
Judoka at the 2020 Summer Olympics
Olympic judoka of Russia
21st-century Russian people